Shannon County is the name of a county in the United States:

 Shannon County, Missouri

as well as:

 Oglala Lakota County, South Dakota, formerly Shannon County